James Kent Hamilton was Republican mayor of Toledo, Ohio, United States 1887–1891.

Biography
James Kent Hamilton was born in Milan, Erie County, Ohio, May 17, 1839. He was the son of Thomas and Sarah O. (Standart) Hamilton. His father was a merchant and shipper, and served as a Whig in the Ohio Senate. James graduated from Milan schools, and from Kenyon College in 1859. He studied law in Mount Vernon, Milan, and Toledo, Ohio, and was admitted to the bar in 1862. He served as a captain in the 113th Ohio Infantry until the end of the American Civil War.

Hamilton resumed the practice of law in Toledo after the war, and was prosecuting attorney of Lucas County in 1869. He was elected mayor of Toledo in 1887 and 1889, serving four years.

Hamilton was married October 13, 1876 to Sibyl Williams, who died in 1877. He married July 27, 1898 to Ethel B. Allen. He was a member of the Methodist Episcopal Church.

Hamilton died December 29, 1918, in Toledo.

References

1839 births
1918 deaths
People from Milan, Ohio
Methodists from Ohio
Ohio Republicans
County district attorneys in Ohio
Kenyon College alumni
Mayors of Toledo, Ohio
Ohio lawyers
Union Army officers
People of Ohio in the American Civil War
19th-century American politicians